Pass Mark is a 1993 Indian Tamil-language comedy film written and directed by V. Balakrishnan. The film stars Ramki and Kasthuri, while Janagaraj, Vivek, and S. S. Chandran appear in supporting roles. It was released on 23 July 1993.

Plot 

Murali is an unemployed prankster that will take any bet for money regardless of any problems it may cause for those around him. He pretends to be dead and a madman for bets and this causes great distress to his parents. They would rather he get an actual job and show some responsibility. Murali becomes a rickshaw driver but is soon drawn back into his old habits. Selvam has a liquor shop and wants to marry Shanthi but her family-and Shanthi herself- is fiercely opposed to this. Her marriage is arranged with someone else. Selvam brings Murali to the wedding and bets that the latter should steal the thaali and return it before anyone notices. Murali agrees and steals the thaali but is drugged by Selvam before he can return it. The deeply superstitious groom calls off the wedding. Murali is guilt-ridden and determined to help Shanthi. Murali's parents want him to marry Kalyani. She's also interested in Murali but he's drawn to Shanthi. Murali must face off against Selvam and his parents in his quest to help Shanthi.

Cast 

Ramki as Murali
Kasthuri as Shanthi
Nandhini as Kalyani
Janagaraj
S. S. Chandran as Murali's dad
Vennira Aadai Moorthy
Vasu Vikram as Selvam
Vivek
King Kong
Omakuchi Narasimhan
Oru Viral Krishna Rao
Ramesh Khanna
Vadivukkarasi
Sachu as Sarasu
Sivaranjani in a special appearance

Production 
Pass Mark marked the directorial debut of K. Balakrishnan who earlier assisted Pandiarajan.

Soundtrack 
The music was composed by Deva, with lyrics written by Vairamuthu.

Reception 
K. Vijiyan of New Straits Times called it "a story with a slight difference" and "serves as a way of good spending 2½ hours." C. R. K. of Kalki praised the performances of the star cast.

References

External links 

1990s Tamil-language films
1993 comedy films
1993 directorial debut films
1993 films
Films scored by Deva (composer)
Indian comedy films